Bone-Appetit: Servin' Up Tha Hits  is the ninth official album from Christian rapper, T-Bone. It is a combination of greatest hits from his past three albums plus some exclusives and hard-to-find fan favorites. It was released September 25, 2007. For this album he was nominated for two Grammy Awards.

Track listing
Follow T
Ride Wit Me
Sing Your Praises [Featuring Natalie LaRue and Mark Stuart of Audio Adrenaline]
I Been Lookin' Around [Featuring Rachael Lampa] - produced by Hallway Productionz
Let That Thing Go [Featuring Mista Grimm] - produced by Hallway Productionz
Dippin'
Wipe Your Tears
Blazin' Microphones
Can I Live [Featuring LaShawn Daniels]
Turn This Up
Gospelalphamegafunkyboogiediscomusic [Featuring KRS-One]
Few Good Men [Featuring Mack 10]
Shake Your Body
Raised In Harlem [Featuring Michael Tait]
King Of My Life [Featuring Natalie LaRue]
Penecostal Horse Racing
Name Droppin' [Featuring Eric Dawkins] - produced by Hallway Productionz
Sing Your Praises (Spanish Version) [Featuring Natalie LaRue and Mark Stuart of Audio Adrenaline]

References

2007 greatest hits albums
Christian music compilation albums
T-Bone (rapper) albums